Gerald "Gerry" V. Round (birth registered second ¼ 1939 – 1 February 1969) was an English professional rugby league footballer who played in the 1950s and 1960s.

Background
Gerry Round was born in Hebden Bridge, West Riding of Yorkshire, England, he was killed in a car crash in Birkenshaw, West Riding of Yorkshire, and his death aged 29 was registered in Spen Valley, West Riding of Yorkshire, England.

Playing career

International honours
Gerry Round won caps for Great Britain while at Wakefield Trinity in 1959 against Australia, and in 1962 against France (2 matches), Australia (3 matches), and New Zealand (2 matches).

Gerry Round achieved the distinction of being Great Britain's full back (v Australia, December, 1959) after only 29 senior games of rugby league football.

Championship final appearances
Gerry Round played  in Wakefield Trinity's 3-27 defeat by Wigan in the Championship Final during the 1959–60 season at Odsal Stadium, Bradford on Saturday 21 May 1960.

Challenge Cup Final appearances
Gerry Round played  in Wakefield Trinity's 38-5 victory over Hull F.C. in the 1959–60 Challenge Cup Final during the 1959–60 season at Wembley Stadium, London on Saturday 14 May 1960, in front of a crowd of 79,773, played  in the 12-6 victory over Huddersfield in the 1961–62 Challenge Cup Final during the 1961–62 season at Wembley Stadium, London on Saturday 12 May 1962, in front of a crowd of 81,263, and played  in the 25-10 victory over Wigan in the 1962–63 Challenge Cup Final during the 1962–63 season at Wembley Stadium, London on Saturday 11 May 1963, in front of a crowd of 84,492.

County Cup Final appearances
Gerry Round played  in Wakefield Trinity's 19-9 victory over Leeds in the 1961–62 Yorkshire County Cup Final during the 1961–62 season at Odsal Stadium, Bradford on Saturday 11 November 1961.

Club career
Gerry Round made his début for Wakefield Trinity during March 1958, and he played his last match for Wakefield Trinity during the 1968–69 season, he appears to have scored no drop-goals (or field-goals as they are currently known in Australasia), but prior to the 1974–75 season all goals, whether; conversions, penalties, or drop-goals, scored 2-points, consequently prior to this date drop-goals were often not explicitly documented, therefore '0' drop-goals may indicate drop-goals not recorded, rather than no drop-goals scored.

Outside of rugby league
Gerry Round attended Rishworth School, West Riding of Yorkshire in the 1950s, before beginning a 3-year civil engineering course at University of Leeds in 1958.

References

External links
!Great Britain Statistics at englandrl.co.uk (statistics currently missing due to not having appeared for both Great Britain, and England)
Gerry Round left HB Rugby to join Wakefield Trinity for 2,000 pounds… unheard of!
 Video 'Rugby League Cup Final 1960' at britishpathe.com
 Video 'Wakefield Win Cup 1962' at britishpathe.com
Video 'Rugby League Final 1963' at britishpathe.com
Search for "Gerry Round" at britishnewspaperarchive.co.uk

1939 births
1969 deaths
English rugby league players
Great Britain national rugby league team players
People from Hebden Bridge
Rugby league fullbacks
Rugby league players from Yorkshire
Wakefield Trinity players